Ragnar Asbjørnsen (22 March 1931 – 4 August 2003), who recorded under the name Ray Adams, was a Norwegian singer. He had a number of hit songs in Norway and other European countries, starting with "Violetta" in 1961, which sold 300,000 copies in Europe. Other hit songs included "De tusen sjöars land", "Jag har bott vid en landsväg" and "Delilah".

References

1931 births
2003 deaths
Musicians from Oslo
20th-century Norwegian male singers
20th-century Norwegian singers